The Gaudie is a student newspaper at the University of Aberdeen covering campus and local news. It has been in circulation since 1934 and is currently free of charge. It aims to print unbiased, student-focused articles.

The Gaudie is partially funded by Aberdeen University Students' Association, and partially by its own advertising revenue. It currently consists of 32 pages split into the sections News, Features, Science and Environment, Opine, International, Puzzles, Satire, Life and Style, Arts, Gaming and Tech, and Sports.

Between 2012 and 2014, The Gaudie saw a raft of changes. The website was given a full redesign (2012/13) and released alongside an app (2014). The paper itself has also had a major redesign for the Graduation edition. Since then, each edition has had some notable minor changes.

History
The Gaudie was first released in 1934 as a weekly student paper. It is recognised as one of the oldest student newspapers in Scotland and the United Kingdom, and in 2003 was stated as the oldest by the Guardian. It has been produced by Aberdeen's student association by students since its inception in 1934. It appeared in the press in 2003 when the then editorial team resigned in protest over the Aberdeen University Students' Association attempts to enforce content and restrict the budget and print run. Since 2009, the paper has successfully re-established itself around the King's College Campus, and Foresterhill. The paper has a number of notable past writers and editors including Alistair Darling and David Torrance.

2003 Resignation controversy
In 2003, there was outrage over the attempts by the Aberdeen University Students' Association to enforce content on the editorial team. AUSA believed that as the Students' Association paid for the paper, they were entitled to advertise the Association and its endeavours. Led by Mark Lindley-Highfield, the entire editorial team of the paper resigned. The issue was taken to Parliament by the MP for Shetland and Orkney, criticizing the Students' Association's "ill-advised move".  During Lindley-Highfield's tenure, the paper doubled its number of pages and increased the proportion of the paper produced in colour while still performing better than budget on the back of increased circulation and greater advertising revenue, which he put down to the excellent team.

2012/2015 Redesign and content improvements 
The major redesign from 2012 to 2015 took inspiration from a number of national newspapers in including the Herald, the Scotsman, the Times, The Guardian and the Independent. It saw the masthead and section headers significantly reduced in size, the introduction of Helvetica Neue as a sans-serifed font, and a change in floating quotes. The Arts section had a complete design overhaul with the introduction of a sleeker magazine style format. The aim of this is to work towards the creation of a pull-out section in the new year.

Alongside the redesign, the 2014/ 2015 editorial team aimed to produce a range of high quality content. This started with exclusive interviews with Alistair Darling and Michael Russell just before the Scottish Independence Referendum. Through the first half of the year they also spoke with former Scottish Socialist Party leader Tommy Sheridan, internationally renowned author Will Self and British rap band Hacktivist, amongst others. Alongside a raft of exclusive student content, they also retained some of the constant features in The Gaudie including 'Style on Campus', 'My Top 5', 'Arts News' and 'Comments on Campus'.

2019 Redesign 
In 2019, The Gaudie was redesigned to have a more consistent look throughout the whole paper. Once more, inspiration was taken from major British newspapers, not in the least from The Guardian. The paper was redesigned to have similar looking mastheads for all sections, except for the Arts and Culture magazine IV, which is part of The Gaudie as a whole. Section colours, which had been previously used for all sections, were gotten rid of. The newly designed mastheads were made to mirror the window pattern of the Sir Duncan Rice Library, an important landmark of Old Aberdeen.

References

External links

Publications established in 1934
Student newspapers published in the United Kingdom
University of Aberdeen
Newspapers published in Scotland
Mass media in Aberdeen
Free newspapers
Biweekly newspapers published in the United Kingdom